This is a list of scheduled monuments in Devon.

Devon
Ash Hole Cavern
Boringdon Camp
Brixham Battery
Castle Close
Cranmore Castle
Huntsham Castle
Kents Cavern
Malmsmead Bridge
Meldon Viaduct
Salcombe Castle

Plymouth 
 Royal Citadel
 Mount Batten Mound
 Mount Batten prehistoric settlement
 Crownhill Fort
 Stamford Fort

Exeter 
see also Scheduled monuments and listed buildings in Exeter.
 Exeter Cathedral Green
 Exeter city wall
 St Nicholas Priory
 Medieval Exe Bridge
 The remains of St Catherines Chapel (Catherine Street)
 Rougemont Castle
 The settlement of Danes Castle
 The remains of The Hall of the Vicar's Choral (South Street)
 The Underground Passages

Devon
Buildings and structures in Devon